Sunnambukulam is a village located near Pulicat Lake in the Thiruvallur district of Tamil Nadu, India.

It has an important place in the history of South India, as a traditional source of lime (Sunnambu) for the region, and thus the name Sunnambukulam (which literally means pond of slaked lime).

References

Villages in Tiruvallur district